Lambert Jackson Woodburne  (13 July 1939 – 5 July 2013) was Chief of the South African Navy from 1 July 1990 to 31 August 1992. He is one of only two people to have been awarded the Van Riebeeck Decoration, which he received for Special Forces operations in Tanzania. He was more commonly known by his nickname "Woody".

Early life
He was born in Kimberley, South Africa in 1939. Woodburne's father was a South African Air Force wartime pilot who farmed near Maclear in the Eastern Cape, South Africa. Woodburne was schooled in the Eastern Cape and Swaziland and served in the Naval Gymnasium at Saldanha Bay in 1958. He then joined the Permanent Force and enrolled for a Bachelor of Military Science (B. Mil) degree studying at both Stellenbosch University and the Faculty of Military Science at the South African Military Academy from 1960 to 1961. He did not graduate and after his time at the Academy he started maritime service on frigates.

Military career
He completed the Specialist Mine Warfare and Clearance Diving Course in the United Kingdom where he came top of the class. On his return to South Africa he became the Officer in Charge of the Naval Diving School in Simon's Town for two years. The Navy Diver of the Course still receives the Woody Woodburne Shield. Woodburne went on to command the mine sweepers SAS Mosselbaai and SAS Johannesburg.

During the submarine’s work-up in France, he was described as one of the “best foreign submariners ever worked up in France”, which earned him the Southern Cross Medal.

In 1972, the SAS Emily Hobhouse landed Special Forces troops led by Commandant Jan Breytenbach near Dar es Salaam as part of a raid on the Tanzanian port. The Special Forces team placed explosives on a bridge, next to power lines and other targets around the city. While making the pickup rendezvous, the submarine snagged a fishing net and sank the fishing vessel dragging the net. This mission earned Woodburne the Van Riebeeck Decoration.

From 1975 to 1977, he was assigned to the Agosta submarine project. After this he served with the Special Forces (1978–1983) in the post of Senior Staff Officer: Operations (Navy) at Special Forces Headquarters, where he attained the rank of Captain. These were "exciting and dangerous years" said Woodburne in an interview after announcing his retirement in August 1992.

From 1983 to 1985, he was the military attaché in Argentina. In 1986 Commodore Woodburne became Director of Naval Operations, then seven months later Chief of Naval Staff Operations. In January 1989 Rear-Admiral Woodburne moved to the Western Cape as Flag Officer Commanding Naval Command West. On 1 July 1990 he was promoted to Vice-Admiral and appointed as Chief of the South African Navy; a position he held until retirement on 31 August 1992.

Personal life
Woodburne married Vivienne Kemp and the couple had two daughters, but they divorced after his retirement.

Admiral Woodburne was diagnosed with Progressive supranuclear palsy in 2007 and was confined to a wheelchair. He died on 5 July 2013 and was accorded a military funeral in Simon's Town.

Decorations and medals

Vice Admiral Woodburne's medal group is unique as it contains the Van Riebeeck Decoration plus two Southern Cross Medals – the 1952–1975 version and the 1976 version, both of which allowed the wearer to use the post nominal title SM.

The citation for the Van Riebeeck Decoration reads:
One occasion, during that year, he was placed in command of an extremely sensitive task in the interest of the security of the State, in the execution of which a great deal had to be relied upon his own judgement and initiative and which demanded positive and dynamic leadership from him. He tackled and executed this difficult task with great courage and daring and, with his personal example, inspired the other members of the team that took part in this task. His positive leadership, perseverance in the face of great odds and his outstanding devotion to duty undoubtedly played a decisive role in the successful execution of the task.

Notes and references

Further reading

External links
 The South African Navy Official Website
 The operational South African navy at SADF Information website; including several pictures of "Woody" Woodburne and Daphné class submarines

2013 deaths
1939 births
People from Kimberley, Northern Cape
Chiefs of the South African Navy
South African military personnel of the Border War
White South African people
South African people of British descent
Submarine commanders
Military attachés